Instituto Femenino de Estudios Superiores IFES is a private university in Guatemala City, Guatemala.

References

External links
Official site

Universities in Guatemala